The Archbishop of Birmingham heads the Roman Catholic Archdiocese of Birmingham in England. As such he is the metropolitan archbishop of the Province of Birmingham. The see in the City of Birmingham where the archbishop's seat is located at the Metropolitan Cathedral and Basilica of Saint Chad.

With the gradual abolition of the legal restrictions on the activities of Catholics in England and Wales in the early 19th century, Rome decided to proceed to bridge the gap of the centuries from Queen Elizabeth I by instituting Catholic dioceses on the regular historical pattern. Thus Pope Pius IX issued the Bull Universalis Ecclesiae of 29 September 1850 by which thirteen new dioceses which did not formally claim any continuity with the pre-Elizabethan English dioceses were created. One of these was the diocese of Birmingham. This has its origins in the Vicariates Apostolic of England, of the Midland District and lastly of the Central District. The last Vicar Apostolic of the Central District, from 28 July 1848, was Bishop William Bernard Ullathorne, O.S.B., who on 29 September 1850 became the first bishop of Birmingham.

In the early period from 1850 the diocese was a suffragan of the Metropolitan See of Westminster, but a further development was the creation under Pope Pius X, on 28 October 1911, of a new Province of Birmingham.

The current archbishop is The Most Reverend Bernard Longley, who was appointed the ninth archbishop of Birmingham on 1 October 2009 and installed at the Metropolitan Cathedral and Basilica of Saint Chad on 8 December 2009, the Solemnity of the Immaculate Conception and one of the patronal feasts of the archdiocese, St Chad being the other.

List of bishops and archbishops

Bishop of Birmingham

Archbishop of Birmingham

See also
 List of Roman Catholic dioceses in England and Wales

References

Birmingham
Lists of English people
Roman Catholic Archdiocese of Birmingham